Patuca National Park is a national park in Honduras. It was established on 1 January 1999 and covers an area of 3755.84 square kilometres.

References

National parks of Honduras
Protected areas established in 1999
Central American pine–oak forests
Central American Atlantic moist forests